</ref> Humayun escaped from the battlefield to save his life. Sher Shah was victorious and crowned himself Farīd al-Dīn Shēr Shāh.

Humayun divided the province of Bengal into Jagirs among his officers and indulged in luxuries. Meanwhile, Sher Khan established his control over various regions and cut off Humayun's contracts with Agra. To put pressure on Sher Khan, Humayun marched towards Agra through the Grand Trunk Road, but Sher Khan provoked Humayun to recross the Ganga river to its southern bank at Chausa. Both armies remained encamped for three months, during which Sher Khan cleverly indulged Humayun in negotiations for peace. With the beginning of the rains, Sher Khan attacked the Mughal forces and caused a lot of confusion among them. The Mughal camp was filled with water, and a great number of soldiers were killed by the Afghans, and about 8000 of them were drowned in the flooded Ganga. Sher Khan captured the Mughal camp along with their artillery and harem. Sher Khan treated the ladies of the harem kindly and made arrangements for their safe return to Humayun.

See also
 Battle of Sirhind (1555)

References

https://archive.org/details/flight-of-deities-and-rebirth-of-temples/page/n79/mode/1up?q=Dham+dev
https://books.google.co.in/books?id=0QeNYCbxMrgC&pg=PA314&dq=sikarwar+chainpur&hl=en&newbks=1&newbks_redir=0&source=gb_mobile_search&ovdme=1&sa=X&ved=2ahUKEwikmqOAltj9AhWbR2wGHZD3C0EQ6wF6BAgFEAU#v=onepage&q=sikarwar%20chainpur&f=false
 
 

Sur Empire
Chausa
Chausa